Editions Lug was a French comic book publisher created in 1950 by writer/editor Marcel Navarro and businessman Auguste Vistel.

History

When it started, Editions Lug only reprinted old French and Italian comics in digest-sized magazines.

Among its most popular Italian imports were:
 Tex Willer (which it began publishing in 1951, then moved to its eponymous magazine in 1952), from Sergio Bonelli Editore 
 Il Grande Blek (which it began publishing in Kiwi in 1955)
 Capitan Miki (which it began publishing in Nevada in 1958) 
 Alan Mistero (renamed Ombrax) (which it began publishing in an eponymous magazine in 1967)
The latter three from Studio EsseGesse.

Another notable non-French comic book series published by Editions Lug at the time is Dan Dare (in 1962).

However, early on, Navarro decided that his company needed some original characters. He enlisted a number of French and Italian studios to script and draw original series and began experimenting with a wide variety of genres. The look and feel of these series was often evocative of 1960s DC Comics.

Editions Lug's first major original success was a Tarzan-like jungle lord named Zembla (1963); its eponymous title was an immediate hit. Among other notable characters created at the times were Rakar, a masked Lakota chief, Tanka, another jungle lord, Gun Gallon, a John Carter of Mars-type hero lost on a parallel world with three moons, World War II hero Rick Ross aka Baroud, kung-fu cowboy Jed Puma, Barbary Coast corsair Dragut and superhero Pilote Noir.

In 1968, Claude Vistel, Auguste Vistel's daughter, returned from a trip to New York and convinced Navarro to publish the first translations of Marvel Comics in France, in a magazine entitled Fantask (1969), which featured Fantastic Four, Spider-Man and the Silver Surfer.

Sensing that he was on to something, Navarro followed suit with his own creations. Wampus was launched the same year; it featured the eponymous alien monster sent by an evil cosmic intelligence to destroy the Earth, and the exploits of a S.H.I.E.L.D.-like organization named C.L.A.S.H.. Unfortunately, Editions Lug had run-ins with French censorship, and both Fantask and Wampus were cancelled after only six issues.

The following year, Navarro re-launched the Marvel characters, first in a magazine called Strange, then in Marvel (which also fell victim to censorship a year later). At the same time, he continued to introduce more new French characters in magazines such as:
 Futura (1972), which published Jaleb, Homicron, Brigade Temporelle, L'Autre (The Other, a toned-down version of Wampus), Aster, Jeff Sullivan and Sibilla
 Waki (1974)
 Kabur which also published Le Gladiateur de Bronze (The Bronze Gladiator) (1975).

The late 1970s and early 1980s were arguably the best years of the company. Its line of French-language Marvel editions thrived with titles such as Titans (1976), Nova (1978), Spidey (1979) and graphic novels of The Fantastic Four (1973), Conan the Barbarian (1976), etc.

A number of new original titles were added, including a revamped version of Mustang (1980), which published Photonik, Mikros and Ozark. Other characters introduced during this period included Phenix (1978) and Starlock (1980). It even licensed its own creations to Spanish and Italian companies, where they sold with great success.

Around this time, a shared universe began to emerge. It wasn't nearly as tightly integrated as the Marvel Universe. While the titles made references to each other, characters from different titles never interacted directly.

In the mid-80's, Auguste Vistel died. This was the beginning of the end for Editions Lug. Eventually, Marcel Navarro chose to retire. The company was sold to the Semic Group, a Scandinavian comic book publisher, and later became a French company, Semic Comics.

In 2004, a group of former Lug writers and artists reclaimed the rights to their characters and reorganized under the banner of Hexagon Comics.

Selected Titles

 Plutos (1950) 
 Rodeo (1951) 
 Tex (1952) 
 Pipo (1952) 
 Pampa (1954)
 Kiwi (1955)
 Pim Pam Poum (1955) (French edition of the Katzenjammer Kids)
 Hondo (1956) 
 Nevada (1958)
 Flambo (1959)
 Bourask (1960)
 Yuma (1962) 
 Zembla (1963)
 Blek (1963)
 Bronco (1966)
 Baroud (1966)
 Dago (1966)
 Ombrax (1966)
 Mustang (1966)
 Fantask (1969)
 Wampus (1969)
 Strange (1970)
 Marvel (1971)
 Futura (1972)
 Yampa (1973)
 Waki (1974)
 Kabur (1975)
 Titans (1976)
 Nova (1978)
 Spidey (1979)

Selected characters

 Afrikanders, Boer War adventures
 Agent Sans Nom, espionage
 Ami Barry, ghost detective
 Antonin, Musketeer adventures
 Apollo, western adventures
 Archie, eccentric scientist
 Aster, science fiction
 L'Autre, toned down sequel to Wampus
 Babette, young fashion model adventures
 Barefoot le Magnifique, French-Indian wars adventures
 Baroud, WWII adventures
 Bathy-09, underwater adventures
 Ben Leonard, archeological, science fiction adventures
 Benny du Bayou, growing up in Louisiana
 Bill & Barry, a boy looking for his parents
 Billy Boyd, western
 Bob Lance, modern-days descendants of the Round Table
 Bob Pepper, insurance investigations
 Bob Stanley, an American in 19th century Japan
 Brigade As, Interpol adventures
 Brigade Temporelle, time travel adventures
 Capitaine Giroflée 
 Captain Tiger, Polynesian adventures
 Captain Tom & Co.
 Le Chat, international boxing
 Champagne
 Chevalier de l'Espace, science fiction
 Chikotawa, Canadian adventures
 C.L.A.S.H.
 Comte de Saint-Germain Corsak, jungle lord
 Dago, supernatural western
 Dan Diamond, espionage
 Dan Lucky, western
 Dan Sabre, western
 Dan Tempest, western
 Dave Kaplan, news photographer
 Dick Demon, supernatural western
 Dick Spade, journalist
 Digger Drake, India under the Raj
 Doc Sullivan, medical adventures
 Don Juan l'Epervier, swashbuckler
 Dragut, pirate
 Etoile à Cinq Branches, supernatural adventures
 Face d'Ange, espionage
 Fargo Jim, western
 Flag des Neiges, Mountain rescue adventures
 Flambo, Napoleon's Little Drummer
 Flanagan, detective
 Frank Ale, boxing adventures
 Frank Universal, ecological science fiction
 Fred & Gib, western
 Frères Thunderbolt, private eyes
 Fury, Korean War
 Galaor, sword & sorcery
 Gallix, heroic fantasy against Rome
 Galton & Trumbo, NYPD adventures
 Gladiateur de Bronze, superhero
 Greg Jordan, racecar driver
 Gun Gallon, heroic fantasy
 Havoc, western
 Homicron, superhero
 Homme de Metal, heroic fantasy
 Hunter, western
 Indian Kid, western
 Ivan Karine, Tsarist Russia adventures
 Ivan Wolonsky, Teenage Psychic
 Jacky West, western
 Jaleb, alien telepath
 Jaydee, alien shapeshifter
 Jean Brume, Scarlet Pimpernel-like hero
 Jean Girodet, espionage
 Jed Puma, western martial arts
 Jeff Sullivan, superhero
 Jill & John Jim Mississippi, masked western avenger
 Johnny Bourask, Colonial hero
 Kabur, heroic fantasy
 Kit Kappa, martial arts
 Larry Cannon, insurance investigations
 Lion des Thermopyles, Greek Antiquity adventures
 Lucifer, fallen angel must do good to redeem himself
 Lys Noir, pirate adventures
 Mac, three Scotsmen in the Old West
 Madison Bill, Prohibition-era adventures
 Malinbourne, space fantasy
 Marino, underwater superhero
 Masque Blanc, Apartheid superhero
 Max Flanagan, World War I photographer
 Max Tornado, superhero
 Mikros, superhero
 Morgane, supernatural adventures
 Motoman, teenage superhero
 Mozam, African jungle lord
 Neptune, underwater adventures
 Oncle Rufus, eccentric superhero
 Ozark, Lakota magic
 Patrouille des Profondeuirs, underground adventures
 Pedro & Doc, western odd couple
 Petit Cube, superhero
 Petit Scout, western adventures
 Phenix, superhero
 Photonik, superhero
 Pilote Noir, superhero
 Prince de la Nuit, crimefighter in 1800 Paris
 Quanter, genius scientist
 Rakar, Lakota superhero
 Rataplan, US Cavalry adventures
 Renard le Flambeur, Mississippi riverboat adventures
 Ricky Rox, western
 Ring Joe, boxing
 Rip MacQueen, journalist
 Rod Zey, engineer and troubleshooter
 Roi des Profondeurs, underwater superhero
 Sadko le Prince Archer, Robin Hood-type adventures
 Sergeant Cannon, WWII adventures
 Sibilla, supernatural adventures
 Silver Shadow, science fiction adventures
 SOS Trio, detective
 Starlock, superhero
 Stormalong, 1800 New Orleans adventures
 Superbill, young prodigy
 Tahy Tim, adventures in the Raj
 Tanka, jungle lord
 Ted Brenton, western adventures
 Tocard Gang, Prohibition-era adventures
 Trapper John, French-Indian Wars adventures
 Trois Lords, three British Lords fight crime
 Utopia, three kids found a new country
 Viking, a viking warrior in the New World
 Waki, post-cataclysmic adventures
 Wampus Wingo Scout, western hero
 X-101, espionage hero
 Yatan, a jungle lord
 Zapo, a western avenger
 Zembla''

See also
 Semic Comics, who purchased Éditions Lug in the mid-1980s
 Hexagon Comics, a multinational syndicate of writers and artists which has reclaimed the rights to the characters they had created for Éditions Lug

External links
Hexagon Comics official website Hexagon Comics website; contains detailed character bios and articles on history of Editions Lug.